St. John Bosco's College of Education is a teacher education college in Navrongo (Kassena Nankana East District, Upper East Region, Ghana) set up in 1946 with 10 male students. The college became a public tertiary institution, established by the Colleges of Education Act (847) 2012, accredited by the National Accreditation Board Ghana , and mandated to train standard teachers for Pre-tertiary Education in Ghana. 

The college is specialised in training teachers in the broad areas of Social, Agriculture and Pure Sciences, as well as Computing, Mathematics, Technical and Vocational disciplines. It is one of the about 40 public colleges of education in Ghana. The college participated in the DFID-funded T-TEL programme.

History 
St. John Bosco's College of Education was established in January 1946 by the Catholic Mission. Ten male students were enrolled to pursue a 2-year post middle Teacher's Certificate ‘B’ course. Out of the ten students, seven completed the course. This course ended in 1961.

St. John Bosco's has recorded several successes in academia, sports and community or social work since its establishment. The college has never scored less than 80% in yearly examinations conducted by the Institute of Education, University of Cape Coast. Several of the graduates of the college are in prominent positions in the country. In sports, the college is the pacesetter among the colleges in Northern Ghana. Bosco's has played a leading role in the education against HIV/AIDS among students in particular, and the public in the Kassena-Nankana District in general.

Old Programmes 

Certificate ‘A’ 4-year (Post Middle) 1961-1969/ 1981-1995
Certificate 'A' 2-year (Post- Secondary) 1970-1978
Specialist Certificate in Art Education 1973-1978
Certificate 'A' 3-year (Post- Secondary) General 1979-1988
Certificate 'A' 3-year (Post-Secondary) Science 1989-1992
Certificate 'A' 3-year Post Secondary Science and Arts 1990-2003
2-year Modular Course for untrained teachers 1983-1989
Diploma in Basic Education (Regular programme) 2004
Diploma in Basic Education (Sandwich) 2005
Certificate 'A' 4-year (Sandwich) 2006.

New (Current) Programmes 
Bachelor of Education Degree, 4-year Junior High School (Level Specialism Programme), 2018

 B.Ed. Information Communication Technology 
 B.Ed. Mathematics
 B.Ed. Science
 B.Ed. Agriculture Science
 B.Ed. Visual Arts
 B.Ed. Home Economics 
 B.Ed. Technical Vocational Skills
Bachelor of Education Degree, 4-year Primary School Education

References 

Christian universities and colleges in Ghana
Colleges of Education in Ghana
Educational institutions established in 1946
1946 establishments in Gold Coast (British colony)
Upper East Region